Eglinton Island an uninhabited island of the Arctic Archipelago in the Northwest Territories, Canada. Eglinton is one of the Queen Elizabeth Islands. It lies on the north side of the M'Clure Strait, just south of the much larger Prince Patrick Island and is uninhabited with no known human activity.

The first European sighting of Eglinton Island was in 1853 by George Mecham, and explored by him and Francis Leopold McClintock in the spring of that year.

Image gallery

References

Sources
 Eglinton Island - Canada's Arctic

External links
 Eglinton Island in the Atlas of Canada - Toporama; Natural Resources Canada

Islands of the Queen Elizabeth Islands
Uninhabited islands of the Northwest Territories